Speed: No Limits is a roller coaster at Oakwood Theme Park, Pembrokeshire, UK. It is a Gerstlauer Euro-Fighter and contains a 90° chain lift hill and a 97° first drop. This drop gave it a five way record tie for the steepest roller coaster drop between itself, Rage, Fahrenheit, SpongeBob SquarePants Rock Bottom Plunge,  Vild-Svinet and Typhoon. The ride was installed by Ride Entertainment Group, who handles all of Gerstlauer's operations in the Western Hemisphere.

Its  lift hill and first drop tower can be seen from a distance away. It is the tallest, fastest and steepest roller coaster in Wales.

Trains
The ride uses four trains, each consisting of two rows, each with four across seating and can carry eight people per train. The trains use standard Euro-Fighter over-the-shoulder restraints.

Ride experience
The ride begins with a right turn and then a 115-foot vertical 90° chain lift hill, this is followed by a 110-foot beyond vertical 97° first drop. Cars then reach a speed of 59 miles per hour at the base of this drop, pulling 4.5 G, cars then crest over an airtime hill, pulling -1.3 G. This is followed by an overbanked turn at an angle of 110° and a vertical loop, cars then rise up into a set of brakes. Cars then descend a small dip, into a heartline roll. The train then turns left with a slight incline then entering a double helix into the final brake run (which consists of magnetic brakes and fin brakes),the cars then turn right into the station.

Colour scheme
The ride is painted orange with turquoise-coloured supports.

Photo gallery

Records

References

External links
 Speed at Oakwood's official site

Roller coasters in the United Kingdom
Roller coasters introduced in 2006